42nd Regiment, 42nd Infantry Regiment or 42nd Armoured Regiment may refer to:

United Kingdom
 42nd Regiment of Foot, a unit of the British Army up to 1881, known as the "Black Watch"
 42 Engineer Regiment (Geographic), a unit of the British Army Royal Engineers
 42nd Royal Tank Regiment, a World War II armoured unit of the British Army
 42nd Deoli Regiment, an infantry regiment of the British Indian Army

United States
 42nd Infantry Regiment (United States), a unit of the US Army

American Civil War regiments

Union (northern) Army
42nd Illinois Volunteer Infantry Regiment
42nd Indiana Infantry Regiment
42nd Kentucky Infantry Regiment
42nd New York Volunteer Infantry Regiment
42nd Ohio Infantry Regiment
42nd United States Colored Infantry Regiment
42nd Wisconsin Volunteer Infantry Regiment

Confederate (southern) Army
 42nd Arkansas Cavalry Regiment
 42nd Mississippi Infantry Regiment
 42nd Virginia Infantry Regiment

Other nations
 42nd Armoured Regiment (India), a unit of the Union of the Indian Army
 42nd Bomber Aviation Regiment, an aviation unit of the Yugoslav Air Force
 42nd Field Artillery Regiment (Lanark and Renfrew Scottish), RCA, a unit of the Canadian Army
 42nd Infantry Regiment (France), a former unit in the French Army

See also
 42nd Division (disambiguation)
 42nd Group (disambiguation)
 42nd Brigade (disambiguation)
 42nd Battalion (disambiguation)
 42 Squadron (disambiguation)